Orion is the designation of a small American sounding rocket. The Orion has a length of 5.60 meters, a diameter of 0.35 m, a launch weight of 400 kg, a launch thrust of 7 kN and a ceiling of 85 kilometers. The Orion, built by NASA Goddard Space Flight Center's Wallops Flight Facility, is also used as an upper stage of sounding rockets, usually paired with a Terrier missile as the first stage.

Incidents
A lightning storm over the Wallops launch pad on 9 June 1987 ignited a NASA Orion rocket and 2 other sounding rockets. The Orion flew horizontally about 300 feet into the ocean. The sounding rockets rose to around 15,000 feet altitude, then fell about 2 miles from the launch pad. No persons were hurt in the incident.

References

Experimental rockets of the United States